The Westgate-on-Sea Tournament also known as the Westgate Tennis Tournament was a men's and women's hard asphalt court tennis tournament founded in 1881 at the Westgate-on-Sea Lawn Tennis Club, St. Mildred's Courts, St. Mildreds Bay, Westgate-on-Sea, Kent, England. The tournament ran annually until 1938 before the start of World War II.

History
The Westgate-on-Sea Tournament was a men's and women's annual tennis tournament founded in 1881 that continued to stage events through until 1938. The winner of the inaugural tournament was held from 9 to 13 September that year with men's singles being won by Mr. G. G. Dineley. The men's doubles was won by Mr. T. Sopwith and Mr. S. Winkley. In 1938 the final edition of this tournament was played from 22 to 27 August. The final men's singles event was by John Olliff.

Finals
 The image right taken in 2008 is St Mildred's Bay. The built up area center right is St. Mildred's Gardens, and slighty to the upper left of center, you can see the Westgate-on-Sea tennis courts site of the old St. Mildred's courts, the courts today are made from hard cement with a taramc surface.

Mens Singles
Incomplete Roll

Mens Doubles

Women's singles (spring)
Incomplete Roll

Women's Singles (Summer)

Mix Doubles

Notes
This tournament in some other sources is known as the St. Mildreds Tournament Westgate on Sea.

References

Sources
 Routledges Sporting Annual (1882) George Routledge and Son. London.
 Thanet Advertiser. (17 April 1930) Thanet, Kent, England.    
 Thanet Advertiser. (8 September 1933) Thanet, Kent, England.

Hard court tennis tournaments
Defunct tennis tournaments in the United Kingdom
Tennis tournaments in England